Japan competed at the 1992 Winter Paralympics in Tignes/Albertville, France. 15 competitors from Japan won 2 medals, both bronze, and finished 19th in the medal table.

See also 
 Japan at the Paralympics
 Japan at the 1992 Winter Olympics

References 

Japan at the Paralympics
1992 in Japanese sport
Nations at the 1992 Winter Paralympics